INS Teg (F45) is the fourth  constructed for the Indian Navy. She was built by the Yantar shipyard in Kaliningrad, Russia, and was commissioned to Navy service on 27 April 2012. She is the first of the second batch of s to be completed.

Design

The Talwar-class guided missile frigates are modified Krivak III-class frigates built by Russia. These ships use stealth technologies and a special hull design to ensure a reduced radar cross section. Much of the equipment on the ship is Russian-made, but a significant number of systems of Indian origin have also been incorporated. The main differences between Teg and the earlier Talwar-class ships are the use of BrahMos missiles in place of the Klub-N missiles and the use of AK-630 instead of Kashtan in the earlier ships. It is the first of the three frigates built in Russia as a follow-up order to the first batch of Talwar-class frigates.

Construction
Teg was laid down on 27 July 2007 and launched on 27 November 2009. Following post-construction work, she began sea trials in the Baltic Sea on 1 September 2011. During Tegs sea trials in mid-October, her port-side turbine was damaged, forcing a two-week delay in her trials schedule while repairs were made. Teg completed her sea trials in early December 2011, leaving only acceptance trials before her delivery to the Indian Navy in April 2012. These trials were completed in early February 2012.

INS Teg was commissioned into the Indian Navy on 27 April 2012, at the Yantar shipyard at Kaliningrad in Russia. She was commissioned by Vice Admiral KN Sushil, Flag Officer Commanding-in-Chief, Southern Naval Command with Captain Rakesh Kumar Dahiya serving as her first commanding officer.

References

Talwar-class frigates
Frigates of the Indian Navy
2009 ships